Ararat Cement Factory CJSC, is one of two companies in Armenia producing Portland cement. It is owned by Gagik Tsarukyan's Multi Group Concern. Founded in 1927 during the Soviet era near the present-day town of Ararat, gave its first production in 1933. The plant operated as a state-owned factory until 2002 when it was privatized and sold to Multi Group Concern.

Massive investments and modernization process were run after the privatization, allowing modern technologies to be installed at the factory. It was later granted an ISO-2001-2002 international certificate.

The factory's production includes: Fast hardening Portland cement without additives, Portland cement with mineral additives, Portland cement without additives and slag Portland cement.

References

External links
Official website (English & Russian)

Manufacturing companies of the Soviet Union
Cement companies of Armenia
Armenian brands